This is a list of diplomatic missions of Botswana. Botswana has a small but far-reaching network of foreign missions abroad.

As a member of the Commonwealth of Nations, Botswanan diplomatic missions in the capitals of other Commonwealth member-states are known as High Commissions.

Excluded from this listing are honorary consulates and trade missions.

Africa

Americas

Asia

Europe

Oceania

Multilateral organizations

Gallery

See also
 Foreign relations of Botswana
 List of diplomatic missions in Botswana
 Visa policy of Botswana

References

Ministry of Foreign Affairs and International Cooperation of Botswana
https://www.botswanatourism.co.bw/embassy-type/botswana-missions-abroad

Botswana
Diplomatic missions